Roonghan is situated in the north west of Dera Ghazi Khan, Pakistan. People of Roonghan speak Balochi and belongs to Leghari Tribe.It has a range of mountains, the most prominent mountain being Yek Bhai. it has a Govt Hospital and a Boys High School located at  "Manhi".  It is the part of Tribal Area D G Khan.

Populated places in Dera Ghazi Khan District